Oj Igmane (Oh, Igman) is the second release by Bosnian folk singer Zehra Deović. It was released 2 October 1963 through the label Jugoton.

Track listing

Personnel
Narodni Ansambl Ismeta Alajbegovića "Šerbe" – ensemble

References

1963 EPs
Zehra Deović albums
Jugoton EPs